Mount Theodore Roosevelt Monument, also known as the Roosevelt Friendship Monument or Friendship Tower, located in the Black Hills National Forest on the outskirts of Deadwood, Lawrence County, South Dakota, is a 31-foot stone tower, including the six-foot-high platform, honoring Theodore Roosevelt. It was the first tribute to the president's memory and was dedicated July 4, 1919.

History
Theodore Roosevelt was a deputy sheriff in Medora, North Dakota in 1884. While looking for a group of horse thieves he met up with Seth Bullock who was the Sheriff of Deadwood. The two became lifelong friends and when Roosevelt died Bullock wanted to erect a monument for his friend. The Society of the Black Hills Pioneers provided financial support to build a tower and it was dedicated on July 4, 1919. In 1966, the Society donated the Tower to the United States Forest Service.

Restoration
In 2010 a restoration project was completed that included foundation stabilization and stone repair. Stairs were added leading up to the platform and handrails on the stairs and the platform. The project was funded by the American Recovery and Reinvestment Act (ARRA). The Deadwood Historic Preservation Commission, the Black Hills Parks and Forest Association, and the Black Hills National Forest were all involved.

References

Monuments and memorials on the National Register of Historic Places in South Dakota
Buildings and structures completed in 1919
Buildings and structures in Lawrence County, South Dakota
Monuments and memorials in South Dakota
Roosevelt, Theodore
Stone sculptures in South Dakota
National Register of Historic Places in Lawrence County, South Dakota